Bribir is a village in the Primorje-Gorski Kotar County of Croatia. It is located near Crikvenica and Novi Vinodolski, in a valley 5 km from the Adriatic Sea. It has a population of 1,695 (census 2011) and the post code HR-51253. It is the seat of the Vinodol Municipality.

General 
The remains of the old walls and the city tower are reminiscent of the time of the princes of Frankopan, whose four centuries of rule left deep spiritual and material traces in Vinodol. Bribir experienced its greatest flourishing during the reign of Prince Bernardin Frankopan, who fortified the castle and the city walls. When the Bribir estate was abolished in 1848, the municipal government demolished the Vela and Mala gates and the castle, and a school was built in its place. Thus ended the long and glorious history of the Bribir fortress in the ruins. The only remnant of the Bribir fort is a rectangular tower dating from 1302 and part of the walls. From the hill on which the old town is situated there is a view of the valley and Novi Vinodolski. Renaissance works of art in the church of St. Peter and Paul testify to the high level of cultural and civilizational reach of medieval Bribir and its strong ties with Europe.

Notable People 
 Anton Tus - is a retired Croatian general who served and was the first Chief of Staff of the Croatian Armed Forces from 1991 to 1992 during the Croatian War of Independence.
 Mihovil Kombol - Croatian literary historian
 Martin Davorin Krmpotić - Croatian priest, revivalist, missionary, essayist, served as chaplain in Bribir
 Josip Pančić (also Josif Pančić) - Croatian and Serbian botanist and professor of natural sciences, born and spent his childhood in Bribir
 Tomo Strizić - Croatian partisan killed during World War II, posthumously named a National Hero of Yugoslavia

References

External links

 Official website of Bribir

Populated places in Primorje-Gorski Kotar County